Colosseum are an English jazz rock band, mixing blues, rock and jazz-based improvisation. Colin Larkin wrote that "the commercial acceptance of jazz rock in the UK" was mainly due to the band. Between 1975 and 1978 a separate band Colosseum II existed playing progressive rock.

History, 1968–1971
Colosseum, one of the first bands to fuse jazz, rock and blues, were formed in early 1968 by drummer Jon Hiseman with tenor sax player Dick Heckstall-Smith, who had previously worked together in the New Jazz Orchestra and in The Graham Bond Organisation, where Hiseman had replaced Ginger Baker in 1966. They met up again early in 1968 when they both played in John Mayall's Bluesbreakers, during which time they played on the Bare Wires album. Childhood friend Dave Greenslade was quickly recruited on organ, as was bass player Tony Reeves who had also known both Hiseman and Greenslade since being teenage musicians in South East London. The band's line-up was completed, after lengthy auditions, by Jim Roche on guitar and James Litherland (guitar and vocals), although Roche only recorded one track before departing.

Their first album, Those Who Are About to Die Salute You, which opened with the Bond composition "Walkin' in the Park", was released by the Philips' Fontana label in early 1969. In March the same year they were invited to take part in Supershow, a two-day filmed jam session, along with Modern Jazz Quartet, Led Zeppelin, Jack Bruce, Roland Kirk Quartet, Eric Clapton, Stephen Stills, and Juicy Lucy.

Colosseum's second album, later in 1969, was Valentyne Suite, notable as the first release on Philip's newly launched Vertigo label, established to sign and develop artists that did not fit the main Philips' brand, and the first label to sign heavy metal pioneers Black Sabbath.

For the third album, The Grass Is Greener, released only in the United States in 1970, Dave "Clem" Clempson replaced James Litherland. Louis Cennamo then briefly replaced Tony Reeves on bass, but was replaced in turn by Mark Clarke within a month. Then Hiseman recruited vocalist Chris Farlowe to enable Clempson to concentrate on guitar. This lineup had already partly recorded the 1970 album Daughter of Time.

In March 1971, the band recorded concerts at the Big Apple Club in Brighton and at Manchester University. Hiseman was impressed with the atmosphere at the Manchester show, and the band returned five days later for a free concert that was also recorded. The recordings were released as a live double album Colosseum Live in 1971. In October 1971 the original band broke up.

Interim, 1971–1994
After the band split, Jon Hiseman formed Tempest with bassist Mark Clarke; Dave Greenslade formed Greenslade together with Tony Reeves. Chris Farlowe joined Atomic Rooster; and Dick Heckstall-Smith embarked on a solo career. Clem Clempson joined the hit group Humble Pie.

Hiseman formed another group called Colosseum II in 1975, with a stronger orientation towards jazz-fusion rock, which featured guitarist Gary Moore and Don Airey on keyboards. They released three albums before disbanding in 1978.

Reunion, 1994–2015 
Colosseum reunited on 24 June 1994 at the Freiburg Zelt Musik Festival, with the same line-up as when they split in 1971.
On 28 October they played a concert in Cologne at E-Werk which was recorded for a TV Special. Recordings from this show were released in 1995 as a CD and a video, and re-released in 2004 as a DVD. The rejuvenated band then played a lengthy tour of mainly German concerts. A second tour followed in 1997, to promote their new studio album "Bread and Circuses". They also appeared at major festivals in 1998, 1999 and 2000.

In 2003 they toured on the back of "Tomorrow's Blues" CD, followed also by gigs in England in 2004. Hiseman's wife, saxophonist Barbara Thompson, joined the band on various occasions. When Dick Heckstall-Smith died in December 2004 she became a permanent member of the band.

In 2005, there were three memorial concerts for Dick Heckstall-Smith, one in Hamburg Germany and two in England.

On 24 September 2005 they performed in Moscow, followed by more concerts in 2006.

In 2007, the made their first appearance in Japan and returned to play more dates in Germany. 

Further tours of Europe were made in 2010.

In October 2010, Jon Hiseman's biography, Playing the Band - The Musical Life of Jon Hiseman, was published. In November 2012, a Kindle version (with minor re-edits) of Playing the Band was published.
   
Colosseum played their "Summer 2011" tour of 22 gigs in Germany, Italy, Austria, Finland and Poland. The tour started in June and ended on 20 August in Germany, Rostock, at Bad Doberan "Zappanale" festival. According to the interview of the bandleader Jon Hiseman, Bad Doberan was the last concert of the band. Their second 'last' concert was in Poland, Slupsk, at "Legends of Rock" festival on 13 August 2011 and the third 'last' concert in Finland, Äänekoski, at "Keitelejazz" festival on the 23 July 2011. These announcements were based on Barbara's worsening Parkinson's condition preventing her from playing. However, with the arrival of new medication, her ability to play was renewed, so those announcements proved to be premature and the band continued to record and play until 2015.

More studio releases followed, as expanded editions of Valentyne Suite and Colosseum Live, and several compilation sets of earlier work. From 2011 to 2014, Colosseum gradually recorded their final album, titled "Time on our Side", which was eventually released late in 2014, to coincide with their final flurry of dates in Germany and the UK. These included 24 concerts during 2014 in Central Europe, starting 23 October at Steinegg Festival, Collepietra, Italy. Followed by concerts in February 2015 before ending on 28 of that month at the Shepherd's Bush Empire, London. At all these concerts, Jon Hiseman confirmed from the stage that this tour would be Colosseum's last.

After 23 years, the band played what Jon referred to as 'the last hurrah!' before a packed and very appreciative audience at the Shepherd's Bush Empire, London on 28 February 2015. Special 'guest' was Ana Gracey, the daughter of Jon Hiseman and Barbara Thompson. Together with Chris Farlowe she sang her own composition "Blues to Music", which was also included on the final Colosseum CD.

Second reunion, 2019–present 

Colosseum reunited again after the death of Jon Hiseman to play selected shows in 2020. The line-up is Chris Farlowe, Clem Clempson and Mark Clarke, joined by Kim Nishikawara (sax), Adrian Askew (keys, organ) and Malcolm Mortimore (drums). In September 2020, it was reported that the keyboard position would be filled by Nick Steed.
This line-up started touring on the 29th of August in Hamburg at Landhaus Walter to be continued in UK. On April 15 2022, they released their new studio album "Restoration".

Members

Current members
 Dave "Clem" Clempson – guitar, vocals 
 Mark Clarke – bass, vocals 
 Chris Farlowe – vocals 
 Kim Nishikawara – saxophones 
 Malcolm Mortimore – drums 
 Nick Steed – organ, synthesizers, piano 

Former members
 Dave Greenslade – organ, piano, synthesizer, vibraphone, keyboards, backing vocals 
 Jon Hiseman – drums 
 Dick Heckstall-Smith – saxophones 
 James Litherland – guitar, vocals 
 Tony Reeves – bass 
 Jim Roche – guitar 
 Louis Cennamo – bass 
 Barbara Thompson – saxophones 
 Adrian Askew – organ, keyboards 

Touring musicians
 Paul Williams – vocals (1999 live - substitute for Chris Farlowe)

Timeline

Discography

Studio albums
 Those Who Are About to Die Salute You (1969)
 Valentyne Suite (1969)
 The Grass Is Greener (1970) (U.S. release only)
 Daughter of Time (1970)
 Bread and Circuses (1997)
 Tomorrow's Blues (2003)
 Time on Our Side (2014)
 Restoration (2022)

Singles
 "Walking in the Park" / "Those About to Die, Salute You" – (1969)
 "Walking in the Park" / "The Road She Walked Before" – (1969)
 "The Kettle" / "Plenty Hard Luck" – (1969)
 "The Daughter of Time" / "Bring Out Your Dead" – (1971)

EPs
 Bread & Circuses – (1997)
 The Kettle – (2001)

Live albums
 Colosseum Live – (1971)
 LiveS  The Reunion Concerts 1994 – (1995)
 Live Cologne 1994 – (2003)
 The Complete Reunion Concert – (2003)
 Live05 – (2007)
 Theme for a Reunion – (2009)
 Live At The Boston Tea Party, August 1969 – (2020)
 Live At The Montreux Jazz Festival 1969 – (2020)
 Live At Ruisrock, Turku, Finland, 1970 – (2020)
 Live At Piper Club, Rome, Italy 1971 – (2020) 
 Live '71, Canterbury, Brighton & Manchester – (2020)
 Transmissions, Live At The BBC – (2020)

Compilation albums
 The Collectors Colosseum – (1971)
 Epitaph – (1986)
 Milestones – (1989) (2-CD collection) 
 Night Riding – (1990)
 Daughter of Time – (1991)
 The Time Machine – (1991)
 The Ides of March – (1995)
 Anthology – (2000) (2-CD collection)
 Best - Walking in the Park – (2000)
 The Best Of – (2002)
 An Introduction To...Colosseum – (2004)
 Morituri Te Salutant – (2009) (4-CD collection)

DVD
 Colosseum LiveS : The Complete Reunion Concert Cologne 1994 – (2002)

See also
Tempest (UK band)
Greenslade
Colosseum II

References

Literature
 Hanson, Martyn: Playing The Band - The Musical Life of Jon Hiseman, Edited by Colin Richardson 2010, London, Temple Music Books, 

Musical groups established in 1968
Musical groups disestablished in 1971
Musical groups reestablished in 1994
Musical groups disestablished in 2015
Musical groups reestablished in 2020
English jazz-rock groups
English progressive rock groups
English jazz ensembles
Dunhill Records artists
Vertigo Records artists
1968 establishments in England
Bronze Records artists